The basilica of Saints Maurice and Lazzarus (Basilica dei Santi Maurizio e Lazzaro), is a church and minor basilica in Turin, Italy.

History 
Its history starts in the sixteenth century, when a previous romanic church from 1207 was restored and dedicated to Saint Paul. In 1729 it was made a basilica and became the church of the Order of Saints Maurice and Lazarus.

References

Bibliography 

 Paolo Boselli, L'Ordine Mauriziano dall'origine ai tempi presenti, Elzeviriana, Torino 1917
 Luciano Tamburini, Le chiese di Torino dal Rinascimento al Barocco, Le Bouquiniste, Torino 1968 , pp. 250–263
 Istituto di Architettura Tecnica del Politecnico di Torino (responsabile Augusto Cavallari - Murat) (a cura di), Forma urbana ed Architettura nella Torino barocca, Vol. I, tomo II, UTET, Torino 1968
 Maurizio Marocco, La Basilica magistrale della sacra religione ed ordine militare de' SS. Maurizio e Lazzaro, Fredi Botta, 1860

Basilica churches in Turin